A. Nallathambi is an Indian politician from Gangavalli. He is a member of the All India Anna Dravida Munnetra Kazhagam party. He was elected as a member of Tamil Nadu Legislative Assembly from Gangavalli (state assembly constituency) in May 2021.

Early life 
His father's name is Angamuthu and his educational qualification is 5th standard pass. As of May 2021 he is 56 years old.

Elections contested

References 

1950s births
Living people
Year of birth uncertain
People from Salem district
Tamil Nadu politicians
All India Anna Dravida Munnetra Kazhagam politicians
Tamil Nadu MLAs 2021–2026